Henry Courtenay is the name of:
Henry Courtenay, 1st Marquess of Exeter (c. 1490–1538)
Henry Courtenay Fenn (1894–1978), American sinologist
 Reginald Courtenay (bishop of Exeter) (Henry Reginald Courtenay, 1741–1803), English bishop of Bristol and bishop of Exeter
Henry Reginald Courtenay (MP) (1714–1763)

See also
Henry A. Courtney, Jr. (1916–1945), U.S. marine